Montgomery Creek is a stream in the U.S. state of Georgia.  It is a tributary to the Etowah River.

Montgomery Creek has the name of the local Montgomery family of settlers.

References

Rivers of Georgia (U.S. state)
Rivers of Lumpkin County, Georgia